Reggi is an Italian surname. Notable people with the surname include:

 Gustavo Reggi (born 1973), Argentinian football player
 Raffaella Reggi (born 1965), Italian tennis player

Italian-language surnames